Meromelia is a birth defect characterized by the lacking of a part, but not all, of one or more limbs with the presence of a hand or foot. It results in a shrunken and deformed extremity.

Cause
Such defects are mainly the results of genetic disorders, but some teratogenic (or environmental) factors have been identified, such as the use of thalidomide from 1957 to 1962 for morning sickness (NVP).

Diagnosis
Meromelia a birth defect characterization by the lacking of a part, but all, of one or more limbs with the presence of a hand or foot.

Treatment
Artificial limbs, surgery, rehabilitation, LASIK

Etymology
Gk, meros ("part") + melia ("limb")

See also
 Amelia (birth defect)
 Phocomelia
 Polymelia
 Thalidomide
 Amniotic Band Syndrome

References

Congenital disorders
Musculoskeletal disorders
Congenital amputations